Kogenheim is a commune in the Bas-Rhin department in Grand Est in north-eastern France.

Geography
The commune is on the east of the Route Nationale RN83, till recently the main road linking Strasbourg with Colmar and still, despite extensive official 'declassification' following the opening of the Autoroute A35 a short distance to the west, a major regional road artery.   Kogenheim also has its own railway station.

See also
Communes of the Bas-Rhin department

References

Communes of Bas-Rhin
Bas-Rhin communes articles needing translation from French Wikipedia